Stellepipona is a small (7 species currently recognized) Afrotropical genus of potter wasps.

References 

Biological pest control wasps
Potter wasps